The following is a list of guns and mortars used by the Royal Regiment of Australian Artillery (RAA) since its formation in 1901. The Regiment is currently undergoing a period of change, acquiring a new light air-portable 155 mm guns, precision guided munitions and a networked command and fire control system. Meanwhile, a number of Army Reserve regiments are re-equipping with mortars as part of a process of rationalisation.

Guns and mortars used by the RAA

See also 
Glossary of British ordnance terms

Notes

References

Further reading

 

Military equipment of the Australian Army
Artillery of Australia